Munzeze is an administrative ward in Buhigwe District  of Kigoma Region of Tanzania. In 2016 the Tanzania National Bureau of Statistics report there were 20,841 people in the ward, from 18,934 in 2012.

Villages / neighborhoods 
The ward has 4 villages and 14 hamlets.

 Munzeze 
 Nyabigele
 Nyakame
 Nyakalela
 Murungu 
 Bigina
 Ruseke
 Kahegamo
 Nyamihanga
 Murungu
 Kigogwe 
 Nyakatongati
 Mawasiliano
 Muungano
 Kishanga 
 Nyamigete
 Nyakame
 Kishanga

References

Buhigwe District
Wards of Kigoma Region